Aslaoda railway station is a small railway station in Ujjain district, Madhya Pradesh. Its code is ASL.

Location 
It is located in Aslaoda village.

Infrastructure 
The station consists of two platforms.

References

External links

Railway stations in Ujjain district
Ratlam railway division